The Kabylie Conflict refers to one of the following: 
Mokrani Revolt
Socialist Forces Front rebellion in 1960s
Berber Spring
Black Spring (Algeria)